The 2015 Big Ten Conference baseball tournament was held at Target Field in Minneapolis, Minnesota, from May 20 through 24.  won their 9th tournament championship to claim the Big Ten Conference's automatic bid to the 2015 NCAA Division I baseball tournament.  The event was aired on the Big Ten Network.

Format and seeding
The 2015 tournament was an 8 team double-elimination tournament.  The top eight teams based on conference regular season winning percentage earned invites to the tournament.  The teams played a double-elimination tournament leading to a single championship game.

Tournament

References

Tournament
Big Ten Baseball Tournament
Big Ten baseball tournament
Big Ten baseball tournament
College baseball tournaments in Minnesota
Baseball competitions in Minneapolis